Pareora is a small town in the South Island of New Zealand. It is located close to State Highway 1, which bypasses the western edge of the town, and close to the Pacific Ocean coast, five kilometres north of Saint Andrews and 10 kilometres south of Timaru. The Pareora River reaches the ocean just to the south of the township.

Demographics
The settlement is part of the larger Fairview statistical area. 

Pareora had a population of 465 at the 2018 New Zealand census, an increase of 33 people (7.6%) since the 2013 census, and an increase of 18 people (4.0%) since the 2006 census. There were 180 households. There were 240 males and 222 females, giving a sex ratio of 1.08 males per female, with 105 people (22.6%) aged under 15 years, 87 (18.7%) aged 15 to 29, 219 (47.1%) aged 30 to 64, and 51 (11.0%) aged 65 or older.

Ethnicities were 86.5% European/Pākehā, 16.8% Māori, 5.2% Pacific peoples, 1.3% Asian, and 2.6% other ethnicities (totals add to more than 100% since people could identify with multiple ethnicities).

Although some people objected to giving their religion, 60.0% had no religion, 24.5% were Christian and 2.6% had other religions.

Of those at least 15 years old, 15 (4.2%) people had a bachelor or higher degree, and 138 (38.3%) people had no formal qualifications. The employment status of those at least 15 was that 189 (52.5%) people were employed full-time, 45 (12.5%) were part-time, and 18 (5.0%) were unemployed.

Education
Pareora East School opened in 1907. It became a campus of Timaru South School in 2005. In 2018, it was closed due to a falling roll.

References

Timaru District
Populated places in Canterbury, New Zealand